Foreign relations exist between Austria and Finland. Austria recognised Finland on January 13, 1918.  Both countries established diplomatic relations on July 19, 1918.  Austria has an embassy in Helsinki and 6 honorary consulates (in Kajaani, Ristiina, Oulu, Tampere, Turku and Vaasa).  Finland has an embassy in Vienna and 8 honorary consulates (in Burgenland, Carinthia, Lower Austria, Upper Austria, Salzburg, Styria, Tyrol, and Vorarlberg).
Both countries are full members of the European Union and of the Council of Europe. 
The two countries became members of the European Union in 1995.

History
However, the two countries became full members of the European Union in 1995. They did not become full members of NATO.

Country comparison

See also 
 Foreign relations of Austria
 Foreign relations of Finland
 1995 enlargement of the European Union
 Austria–Sweden relations
 Austria–NATO relations 
 Finland–NATO relations

External links 
  Austrian Ministry of Foreign Affairs: list of bilateral treaties with Finland (in German only)
  Finnish Ministry of Foreign Affairs about the relation with Austria
  Finnish embassy in Vienna (in Finnish, German and Swedish only)

 
Finland 
Bilateral relations of Finland